Saint Sixtus (or San Sisto in Italian) may refer to the following:

People
Pope Sixtus I (d. 128)
Pope Sixtus II (d. 258), martyr
Pope Sixtus III (d. 440)
Sixtus of Reims (d.c. 300), first bishop of Reims

Places

Italy
San Sisto, Piacenza, church in Piacenza
San Sisto, Pisa, church in Pisa
San Sisto Vecchio, church in Rome
San Sisto, Viterbo, church in Lazio
San Sisto (Genoa), church in Genoa
San Sisto al Pino, village in the province of Pisa

Belgium
St. Sixtus' Abbey, Westvleteren, West Flanders

Australia
San Sisto College, Brisbane

See also
Sixtus (disambiguation)
Saint-Sixte (disambiguation)